Jepson Peak is a summit,  west of San Gorgonio Mountain, in the San Gorgonio Wilderness.

The peak is named for Willis Linn Jepson, who was a University of California botanist and a charter member of the Sierra Club.

References

Mountains of San Bernardino County, California
San Bernardino Mountains
Mountains of Southern California